Rajab is a masculine Arabic given name corresponding to the seventh month of the Islamic calendar, it is transcribed as Recep in Turkish, and Ragab from Egyptian Arabic, and Rexhep in Albanian.

Given name
 Ragab Abdelhay, Egyptian weightlifter
 Rajab Ali, Kenyan cricketer
 Babu Rajab Ali, Indian writer
 Omar Rajab Amin, Kuwaiti prisoner
 Rajab Bursi, Iraqi Sufi
 Ismail Ahmed Rajab Al Hadidi, Iraqi politician
 Salih Rajab al-Mismari, Libyan politician
 Rajab Mwinyi, Burundian footballer

Surname
 Abdallah Ragab, Egyptian footballer
 Ahmed Ragab (satirist), Egyptian satirist
 Ahmed Ragab (sailor), Egyptian sailor
 Muhammad az-Zaruq Rajab, Libyan politician
 Sauda Rajab, Kenyan business executive

Arabic-language surnames
Arabic masculine given names